Tashi, also spelled Trashi, is a Tibetan word meaning "good fortune" or "auspiciousness". Tashi or Trashi may refer to:

People
Dagpo Tashi Namgyal, 16th-century Tibetan scholar
Guru Tashi, legendary ancestor of the Sikkimese royal family
Ngawang Tashi Bapu (born 1968), musician known as "Lama Tashi"
Tashi Choden (born 1998), Bhutanese model and beauty pageant titleholder
Tashi Lama, another name for Tibet's Panchen Lama
Tashi Namgyal (1893–1963), king of Sikkim, 1914–1963
Tashi Peljor (born 1978), Bhutanese Olympic archer
Tashi Tsering (disambiguation), several people
Tashi Tenzing (born 1965), Sherpa mountaineer
Tashi Wangdi, official in the Tibetan government-in-exile

Places
Tashi, Longyou County (塔石镇), a town in Longyou County, Zhejiang, PR China
Tashi Dor, a peninsula on Namtso Lake, Tibet
Tashi Lhunpo Monastery, Shigatse, Tibet
Tashi Yangtse, the administrative center of Tashi Yangtse District, Bhutan

Other uses
Tashi (dip), a Meze dish made from tahini, garlic, salt and lemon juice
Tashi, a series of children's books by Anna Fienberg
Tashi (TV series), a television adaptation of the book series
Tashi delek, a Tibetan all-purpose greeting with the meaning of "blessings and good luck".
Tashi Group, a privately owned industrial/commercial group in Bhutan
Tashi Namgyal Academy, a public school in Sikkim, India
Tashi Quartet, an American ensemble of classical musicians, originally formed in 1973 as "Tashi"

See also
 
 Tashigang (disambiguation)